Tender Is the Night is an album by American pop singer Johnny Mathis that was released by Mercury Records on January 23, 1964 and included selections from stage and screen as well as two new songs from "Fly Me to the Moon" composer Bart Howard.

This first of four studio albums that Mathis released that year debuted on Billboard magazine's Top LP's chart in the issue dated February 15, 1964, and remained there for 28 weeks, peaking at number 13.

The album was released on compact disc for the first time as one of two albums in a two-CD set by Sony Music Entertainment on August 28, 2012, the other album being Mathis's follow-up from the summer of 1964, The Wonderful World of Make Believe. Tender Is The Night was also included in Sony's Mathis box set The Complete Global Albums Collection, which was released on November 17, 2014.

History

Mathis had collaborated with Don Costa on his four previous studio albums (Rapture, Johnny, Romantically, and Sounds of Christmas), and used him again here as both arranger and conductor. In an interview for the 2012 CD release, Mathis said, "'Tender Is the Night was a wonderful time for me because I got to work with Don Costa again.  A great guy.  And, you know, he did all his stuff while we were on the date…I mean, he was writing and rewriting there on the date.'" For the liner notes of The Complete Global Albums Collection, Mathis wrote of Costa's arrangement of "Laura", "To this day, whenever I do concerts with symphony orchestras, which I do a lot, this is the most popular song I do because of Don Costa’s exquisite orchestrations."

Another song on the album gave Mathis the opportunity to provide some insight into his emphasis upon including as many verses as he does: "'I loved singing songs that were part of that great songbook that was recorded at the time by Ella Fitzgerald and eventually Sarah Vaughan.  I listened to those things over and over, learning songs like "A Ship Without a Sail". I used to just sit on the bed and play those songs over and over and learn the verses.  That’s the reason I sang so many verses on my recordings…I listened to Ella and Sarah do the verses…and they sang them meticulously.'"

Track listing

Side one
"Tender Is the Night" from Tender Is the Night (Sammy Fain, Paul Francis Webster) - 3:44
"Laura" from Laura (David Raksin, Johnny Mercer) - 4:38
"No Strings"  from No Strings (Richard Rodgers) - 3:13
"I Can't Give You Anything But Love"  from Blackbirds of 1928 (Jimmy McHugh, Dorothy Fields) - 2:46
"April Love"  from April Love (Sammy Fain, Paul Francis Webster)- 2:58
"Call Me Irresponsible"  from Papa's Delicate Condition (Sammy Cahn, Jimmy Van Heusen) - 3:42

Side two
"A Dream Is a Wish Your Heart Makes"  from Cinderella (Mack David, Al Hoffman, Jerry Livingston) - 3:01
"A Ship Without a Sail"  from Head's Up! (Richard Rodgers, Lorenz Hart) - 4:08
"Forget Me Not" (Bart Howard) - 2:33
"Where Is Love?"  from Oliver! (Lionel Bart) - 2:26
"Somewhere"  from West Side Story (Leonard Bernstein, Stephen Sondheim) - 4:32
"Tomorrow Song" (Bart Howard)- 3:06

Personnel

Johnny Mathis – vocals; producer
Don Costa – arranger, conductor
Okamoto/London – cover design

References

Bibliography

1964 albums
Johnny Mathis albums
Mercury Records albums
Albums conducted by Don Costa
Albums arranged by Don Costa
Albums produced by Johnny Mathis